The next election to the Landtag of Baden-Württemberg is scheduled for 2026.

Background 
In the 2021 state election, the Greens, led by Minister-President Winfried Kretschmann, were the strongest with 32.6%, giving them their best nationwide result ever in a state election. For Baden-Württemberg, the CDU achieved its poor result with 24.1%, the SPD also achieved its worst result with 11%, but again became the third strongest force, the FDP achieved one of its best results with 10.5%. The AfD suffered heavy losses, becoming the weakest force in the state parliament with 9.7%.

The Third Kretschmann cabinet was formed; a Green–CDU coalition.

In April 2022, the Landtag amended the state's electoral law, so that a second vote and closed list was added. In addition, the voting age was lowered to age 16.

Opinion polls

Graphical summary

Party polling

References 

Elections in Baden-Württemberg
2026 elections in Germany